Walter North may refer to:
Walter E. North, American ambassador
Walter H. North, American politician, member of the Michigan Senate
Walter Harper North, American judge, justice and chief justice of the Michigan Supreme Court, grandfather of Walter H. North